= Swakula Sali =

Hindu ethnic community in India

Swakul Sali (also known as Swakulsali and Sali or Rugwed sali) is an ethnic community found among Hindus in India. They claim descent from the Jivheshwara. Marathi is the primary language spoken by the Swakun Salis, who also speak local dialects. Their primary professions is weaving. It was Swakun Salis who first created Narayanpet silk and cotton factory.

== Religion ==
The swakula salis are, according to devout legend, direct descendants of Lord Jihveshwara (son of Lord Mahadeva, born from his tongue)) and command very high status in the Hindu society.Later they were regarded as Brahmin origin due to their adept command over rigveda and samveda and their contributions to them.At some point of history they were not satisfied performing only mundane Brahmanical rituals hence due to high social affinity and responsibility became Kshatriya as well (it is said that during their Kshatriya phase, one of the families founded the Vakataka dynasty which had significant influence in Central India during 3rd to 5th century AD).They were supposed to spread Vedic knowledge travelling from one place to another and also earn livelihood with their expertise in clothes weaving technology and trading which included clothes for the nobility, aristocracy and also the Gods.

Adimaya requested Shiva to create a Punya Purusha who can weave exquisite clothes. Upon instructions from Adimaya, Shiva created a child from his tongue (JHIHVE) in Shravan Masa, Trayodashi, early morning on Monday. The naming ceremony was performed in great pomp at Mount Kailash. The boy was named 'SALI' to assist everybody by all means in weaving, designing and colouring of the cloth. Goddess Parvati named his Kula (i.e. Clan) as Swakula for promoting in the mankind. As the child was born through the tongue of Shiva, Goddess Parvati named him as "Jhiveshwara". Also the child was born at the time of Sunrise, hence his Clan was decided to be Suryavanshi. Famous Saree "Paithani" was firstly introduced in Paithan which was woven by salisamaj and still today continues. Then some people shifted from Paithan (now in Aurangabad Dist. of Maharashtra) to Yeola (Nasik District of Maharashtra). Today Paithani Saree of Yeola is also Famous.
